Mahi Badruddoza Chowdhury (born 13 March 1970) is a Bangladeshi politician and the incumbent Jatiya Sangsad member representing the Munshiganj-1 constituency. He is currently the joint secretary general of the party Bikalpa Dhara Bangladesh (BDB). He is the son of former President of Bangladesh A. Q. M. Badruddoza Chowdhury.

Background
Chowdhury completed his bachelor's in political science from Santa Clara University in California, United States.

Career
Chowdhury first joined the Bangladesh Nationalist Party (BNP) in August 1992. He was first elected to the parliament in the 2002 by-election from Munshiganj-1 constituency when the seat became vacant after his father, A. Q. M. Badruddoza Chowdhury, had taken the position of the President of Bangladesh.

On 21 June 2002, Chowdhury's father resigned from the presidency after facing the possibility of impeachment and removal from office by the BNP-led parliament. Subsequently, Chowdhury resigned from BNP on 10 March 2004 and joined the Bikalpa Dhara Bangladesh (BDB) – a political party founded by his father. This resignation left a void in the Munshiganj-1 constituency and a by-election was held on 6 June 2004. Chowdhury competed as a member of the BDB party from the same constituency and won the election defeating the BNP candidate Momin Ali.

In November 2003, state-owned Bangladesh Television (BTV) suspended transmission of two programmes, a talk-show Ananda Ghanta and a drama-play Uttaradhikar, from the production company Entertainment Republic, owned by Chowdhury.

In 2007, Chowdhury was briefly involved with the Liberal Democratic Party (LDP).

In June 2012, Chowdhury expressed favorable views of Khaleda Zia, the leader of his previous party, BNP, by saying "Khaleda Zia is the symbol of unity and strength. She always led from the front whenever the country was in a crisis and the people were in distress. Now, she is leading the people's movement pressing for a neutral and non-partisan government."

In April 2015, Chowdhury contested for the mayoral election of Dhaka North City Corporation and finished third with 12,809 votes, compared to Bangladesh Awami League candidate Annisul Huq's 460,117 and BNP candidate Tabith Awal's 325,080 votes.

In 2019, the Anti-Corruption Commission (ACC) interrogated Chowdhury on allegations of money laundering and accumulation of illegal wealth. Chowdhury denied any wrongdoing.

References

Bikalpa Dhara Bangladesh politicians
8th Jatiya Sangsad members
11th Jatiya Sangsad members
Santa Clara University alumni
1970 births
Living people
Place of birth missing (living people)